Derrick Krantz (born January 13, 1988) is an American professional mixed martial artist who most recently competed in the Welterweight division of the Ultimate Fighting Championship (UFC). A professional competitor since 2008, he has also competed for Bellator MMA and Legacy Fighting Alliance.

Background
Krantz moved to Texas at age 16 and began his martial arts career training in Kung Fu to keep him preoccupied and out of trouble.

Mixed martial arts career

Early career
Krantz compiled an amateur record of 9-5-1 before he made his professional debut on July 18, 2008 vs. Jay Hall, winning via first-round TKO. He amassed an 11-5 record on the regional circuit, competing against UFC veterans Dustin Poirier and Rich Clementi before making his Bellator MMA debut in 2012.

Bellator MMA 
Krantz made his Bellator MMA debut on March 16, 2012 at Bellator 61 vs. Eric Scallan, winning via first-round submission. His next bout was against future Bellator Welterweight Champion Andrey Koreshkov at Bellator 69, losing via third-round TKO.

Legacy FC/Legacy Fighting Alliance
After a pair of victories at Legacy FC 14 and Legacy FC 16, Krantz moved down to Lightweight to face former UFC Welterweight title contender Jorge Patino for the Legacy Lightweight Championship at Legacy FC 18, losing via second-round submission. He received another title shot at Legacy FC 43, this time for the vacant Legacy Welterweight Championship on July 17, 2015 vs. UFC veteran Brock Larson, winning via third-round knockout. He lost the title via first-round submission against Alex Morono at Legacy FC 49.

Krantz competed for the vacant Legacy Fighting Alliance Welterweight Championship at LFA 12 on May 19, 2017 vs. Ben Neumann, winning via second-round TKO. He lost the title via split decision against James Nakashima at LFA 23.

Ultimate Fighting Championship
Following a four-fight winning streak, Krantz was named a short-notice replacement for Neil Magny at UFC Fight Night: dos Anjos vs. Lee on May 18, 2019 vs. Vicente Luque. He lost the fight via first-round TKO.

Krantz faced Song Kenan on August 31, 2019 at UFC on ESPN+ 15. He lost the fight via unanimous decision, and was subsequently released from the promotion.

Championships and accomplishments

Mixed martial arts
 Legacy Fighting Championship
 Legacy FC Welterweight Championship (One time)
 Legacy Fighting Alliance
 LFA Welterweight Championship (One time, first)

Mixed martial arts record

|-
|Win
|align=center| 26–12
|Chauncey Foxworth
|Decision (unanimous)
|AKA 18
|
|align=center| 5
|align=center| 5:00
|Bossier City, Louisiana, United States
|
|-
|Win
|align=center| 25–12
|Nolan Norwood
|KO (punches)
|AKA 14
|
|align=center| 1
|align=center| 2:17
|Bossier City, Louisiana, United States
|
|-
|Loss
|align=center|24–12
|Song Kenan
|Decision (unanimous)
|UFC Fight Night: Andrade vs. Zhang 
|
|align=center|3
|align=center|5:00
|Shenzhen, China
|
|-
|Loss
|align=center| 24–11
|Vicente Luque
|TKO (punches)
|UFC Fight Night: dos Anjos vs. Lee
|
|align=center|1 
|align=center|3:52
|Rochester, New York, United States
|
|-
|Win
|align=center| 24–10
|Justin Patterson
|KO (punches)
|LFA 63
|
|align=center| 1
|align=center| 2:23
|Belton, Texas, United States
|
|-
|Win
|align=center| 23–10
|Hayward Charles
|TKO (punches)
|AKA: Rite of Passage 5
|
|align=center| 2
|align=center| 4:47
|Bossier City, Louisiana, United States
| 
|-
|Win
|align=center| 22–10
|Kassius Holdorf
|Decision (split)
|LFA 42
|
|align=center| 3
|align=center| 5:00
|Branson, Missouri, United States
|
|-
|Win
|align=center| 21–10
|Artenas Young
|Decision (unanimous)
|AKA: Rite of Passage 3
|
|align=center| 3
|align=center| 5:00
|Bossier City, Louisiana, United States
|
|-
|Loss
|align=center| 20–10
|James Nakashima
|Decision (split)
|LFA 23
|
|align=center| 5
|align=center| 5:00
|Bossier City, Louisiana, United States
|
|-
|Win
|align=center| 20–9
|Ben Neumann
|TKO (punches)
|LFA 12
|
|align=center| 2
|align=center| 0:55
|Prior Lake, Minnesota, United States
| 
|-
|Win
|align=center| 19–9
|Hayward Charles
|Decision (unanimous)
|LFA 4
|
|align=center| 3
|align=center| 5:00
|Bossier City, Louisiana, United States
|
|-
|Win
|align=center| 18–9
|Dave Burrow
|Submission (rear-naked choke)
|Legacy FC 57
|
|align=center| 1
|align=center| 4:22
|Bossier City, Louisiana, United States
|
|-
|Loss
|align=center| 17–9
|Alex Morono
|Submission (guillotine choke)
|Legacy FC 49
|
|align=center| 1
|align=center| 4:29
|Bossier City, Louisiana, United States
| 
|-
|Win
|align=center| 17–8
|Brock Larson
|KO (punches)
|Legacy FC 43
|
|align=center| 3
|align=center| 2:38
|Hinckley, Minnesota, United States
| 
|-
|Win
|align=center| 16–8
|Daniel Roberts
|Submission (Von Flue choke)
|Legacy FC 35
|
|align=center| 1
|align=center| 2:49
|Tulsa, Oklahoma, United States
|
|-
|Win
|align=center| 15–8
|Kyle Bradley
|Submission (rear-naked choke)
|Legacy FC 32
|
|align=center| 1
|align=center| 3:44
|Bossier City, Louisiana, United States
| 
|-
|Loss
|align=center| 14–8
|Derek Campos
|Submission (rear-naked choke)
|Ascent Combat: Mayhem 3
|
|align=center| 3
|align=center| 4:15
|Shreveport, Louisiana, United States
|
|-
|Loss
|align=center| 14–7
|Jorge Patino
|Submission (guillotine choke)
|Legacy FC 18
|
|align=center| 2
|align=center| 3:07
|Houston, Texas, United States
|
|-
|Win
|align=center| 14–6
|Charles Byrd
|Submission (rear-naked choke)
|Legacy FC 16
|
|align=center| 1
|align=center| 3:02
|Dallas, Texas, United States
| 
|-
|Win
|align=center| 13–6
|Brandon Farran
|Submission (rear-naked choke)
|Legacy FC 14
|
|align=center| 1
|align=center| 1:11
|Houston, Texas, United States
|
|-
|Loss
|align=center| 12–6
|Andrey Koreshkov
|TKO (knees and punches)
|Bellator 69 
|
|align=center| 3
|align=center| 0:51
|Lake Charles, Louisiana, United States
|
|-
|Win
|align=center| 12–5
|Eric Scallan
|Technical Submission (brabo choke)
|Bellator 61
|
|align=center| 1
|align=center| 3:01
|Bossier City, Louisiana, United States
|
|-
|Loss
|align=center| 11–5
|Sean Spencer
|Decision (unanimous)
|Fight Game: Premier Event
|
|align=center| 3
|align=center| 5:00
|Frisco, Texas, United States
|
|-
|Loss
|align=center| 11–4
|Brian Melancon
|Decision (unanimous)
|Legacy FC 5
|
|align=center| 3
|align=center| 5:00
|Houston, Texas, United States
|
|-
|Win
|align=center| 11–3
|Ryan Larson
|Submission (rear-naked choke)
|King of Kombat 9
|
|align=center| 1
|align=center| 4:28
|Austin, Texas, United States
|
|-
|Win
|align=center| 10–3
|Rocky Long
|Submission (rear-naked choke)
|Ascent Combat:  The Beginning
|
|align=center| 1
|align=center| 3:59
|Shreveport, Louisiana, United States
|
|-
|Loss
|align=center| 9–3
|Dustin Poirier
|Submission (armbar)
|USA MMA: Night of Champions 2
|
|align=center| 2
|align=center| 3:35
|Lafayette, Louisiana, United States
|
|-
|Loss
|align=center| 9–2
|Rich Clementi
|Submission (armbar)
|Team 3:16 MMA: Season's Beatings
|
|align=center| 1
|align=center| 4:54
|Shreveport, Louisiana, United States
|
|-
|Win
|align=center| 9–1
|Mike Clifton
|Submission
|Steele Cage 2
|
|align=center| 1
|align=center| 1:46
|Frisco, Texas, United States
|
|-
|Loss
|align=center| 8–1
|Todd Moore
|TKO (punches)
|Ascent Combat: It's On
|
|align=center| 3
|align=center| 2:59
|Shreveport, Louisiana, United States
|
|-
|Win
|align=center| 8–0
|Donald Wallace
|TKO (punches)
|Cajun FC
|
|align=center| 1
|align=center| 3:27
|Lafayette, Louisiana, United States
|
|-
|Win
|align=center| 7–0
|Adam Schindler
|TKO (punches)
|Ascent Combat: Best of the Best Tournament
|
|align=center| 2
|align=center| 1:14
|Shreveport, Louisiana, United States
|
|-
|Win
|align=center| 6–0
|Jason Wright
|Submission (rear-naked choke)
|3:16 Productions: Unstoppable
|
|align=center| 1
|align=center| 2:44
|Shreveport, Louisiana, United States
|
|-
|Win
|align=center| 5–0
|Aaron Hall
|Submission (arm-triangle choke)
|Cage Kings: Total Domination
|
|align=center| 1
|align=center| 2:46
|Bossier City, Louisiana, United States
|
|-
|Win
|align=center| 4–0
|Cleo Wright
|TKO (punches)
|Reality Check
|
|align=center| 1
|align=center| 1:24
|Shreveport, Louisiana, United States
|
|-
|Win
|align=center| 3–0
|Chance Burke
|TKO (punches)
|Cage Kings: Destruction at the Dome
|
|align=center| 1
|align=center| 1:39
|Bossier City, Louisiana, United States
|
|-
|Win
|align=center| 2–0
|Brandon Jinnies
|TKO
|Louisiana FC 2
|
|align=center| 1
|align=center| 0:00
|Baton Rouge, Louisiana, United States
|
|-
|Win
|align=center| 1–0
|Jay Hall
|TKO (punches)
|Cage Kings
|
|align=center| 1
|align=center| 0:56
|Bossier City, Louisiana, United States
|
|-

See also
List of current UFC fighters
List of male mixed martial artists

References

External links
 
 

Living people
1988 births
American male mixed martial artists
Welterweight mixed martial artists
Mixed martial artists from Texas
Mixed martial artists from California
Mixed martial artists utilizing wushu
Mixed martial artists utilizing Brazilian jiu-jitsu
American wushu practitioners
American practitioners of Brazilian jiu-jitsu
People awarded a black belt in Brazilian jiu-jitsu
Ultimate Fighting Championship male fighters